The Sierra La Esmeralda range, (Emerald Mountains) are a mountain range in northern Sonora, Mexico at the northern region of the Sierra Madre Occidental cordillera. The region contains sky island mountain ranges, called the Madrean Sky Islands, some separated from the Sierra Madre Occidental proper, and occurring in the northeastern Sonoran Desert, and extreme west-northwestern Chihuahuan Desert. Many of the ranges occur in southeast Arizona.

Sierra La Esmeralda anchors the southern portion of the Tumacacori Highlands. The range is part of a Sky Island Alliance study of wild cats, called Cuatros Gatos, (Four Cats).

Nogales, Arizona and Nogales, Sonora lie at the northeast of the range.

Tumacacori Highlands
The Tumacacori Highlands is a series of connected mountain ranges in western Santa Cruz County, Arizona. The Highlands are northwest of Nogales and are bordered on the east by the Santa Cruz River Valley, that is traversed north–south by I-19. Across the valley eastwards are the tall Santa Rita Mountains in the northeast, and the smaller San Cayetano Mountains, east and adjacent to Nogales's northeast. The sequence of the north-to-south Tumacacori Highlands is as follows:

North-to-south:
 Tumacacori Mountains
 Peck Canyon – (Peck Canyon Road)
 Atascosa Mountains – (6 mi x 9 mi)
 Ruby Road – (to Ruby, Arizona); Pena Blanca Lake
 Pajarito Mountains
 Mexico–Arizona border
 Sierra La Esmeralda – (the Emerald Mountains)

A Santa Cruz county-border "bootheel" extends southwest; the bootheel contains Cobre Ridge, and it is connected northwest to a small range, the San Luis Mountains which are in the southeast of the Altar Valley, and borders the Buenos Aires National Wildlife Refuge.

Historical mission communities, at Tumacacori National Historical Park, in Tumacacori, Arizona lie at the southeast foothills of the Tumacacori Mountains.

References

 Arizona Highways. Emerald Isle, Terry Greene Sterling, photography, Jack Dykinga, February, 2010, pp. 40–43.

External links
 Azcentral.com: Tumacacori Mountains and Atascosa Atascosa – to the north.
 Madrean.org: Euphorbia (spurge) – flora; Universidad de Sonora (DICTUS).

Landforms of the Sierra Madre Occidental
Madrean Sky Islands mountain ranges
Mountain ranges of Sonora
Mountain ranges of Arizona
Mountain ranges of Santa Cruz County, Arizona
Sierra Madre Occidental